Novis is a surname. Notable people with this surname include:

 Donald Novis (1906–1966), English-born American actor and tenor
 Emile Novis, pseudonym of Simone Weil
 Thomas Shephard Novis (1874–1962), British surgeon
 Tony Novis (1906–1997), English rugby union player